Sainte-Famille Church (Holy Family Church) is a Catholic church in Kiyovu, downtown Kigali, in Rwanda. It is located on a hill, close to the commercial district of Rugenge.  Sainte-Famille Church was the scene of killings during the genocide in April 1994.

Architecture
The building is constructed from red brick, but its facade is embellished with white panels.  Besides the parish church, it also includes a visitor centre, a clinic, a primary school, a driving school and buildings leased to individuals by the parish.

History
Constructed in 1913, the building is one of the largest churches in the city. 

During the genocide of 1994 thousands of Tutsi and Hutu took refuge in the church and many were massacred, following the death of President Juvénal Habyarimana. 
Witnesses have alleged that the priest in charge of the church, Father Wenceslas Munyeshyaka, who had armed himself, helped Hutu militias take people from the church to be killed.
Munyeshyaka allegedly agreed to "let the militia pick off those they wanted every now and then."

Speaking ten years later, father Antoine Kambanda, director of the local branch of the Caritas charity, acknowledged that some members of the Catholic church had been involved in the killings, although others had done what they could to prevent them.

References

Buildings and structures in Kigali
Roman Catholic churches completed in 1913
1913 establishments in German East Africa
20th-century Roman Catholic church buildings in Rwanda